Marsel van Oosten is a Dutch photographer specialising in nature and wildlife photography. He has been overall winner of the Wildlife Photographer of the Year and Travel Photographer of the Year competitions.

Publications
Wild Romance: Africa's most romantic safari lodges. Cape Town: Struik Lifestyle, 2009. By van Oosten and Daniëlla Sibbing. .
Mother: A Tribute to Mother Earth. Kempen, Germany: teNeues, 2021. .

Awards
 2005: 1st Prize, International Photography Awards (IPA)
 2006: 1st Prize, International Photography Awards
 2008: 1st Prize, International Photography Awards
 2009: 3rd Prize, International Photography Awards
 2015: Overall winner, Travel Photographer of the Year
 2018: Grand title winner, Wildlife Photographer of the Year

References

External links 
 

Nature photographers
Living people
Photographers from Rotterdam
Year of birth missing (living people)